William McPheat (4 September 1942 – 7 April 2019) was a Scottish professional footballer who played as an inside forward for Sunderland.

References

1942 births
2019 deaths
Footballers from North Lanarkshire
Scottish footballers
Association football inside forwards
Sunderland A.F.C. players
Hartlepool United F.C. players
Airdrieonians F.C. (1878) players
English Football League players
Scottish Football League players